Operation Desert may refer to:

Military operations
 Operation Desert (German fuel project), a project established in June 1944 by Nazi Germany
 Operation Desert Badger, a U.S. response plan if a pilot was shot down while patrolling the Iraqi no-fly zones
 Operation Desert Farewell, the return of American units and equipment to the United States in 1991 after the liberation of Kuwait
 Operation Desert Fox, December 1998 bombing of Iraq
 Operation Desert Lion, an operation of the U.S. 505th Parachute Infantry Regiment and 82nd Airborne Division in Afghanistan
 Operation Desert Scorpion (Iraq 1998), an unperformed military operation in 1998
 Operation Desert Scorpion (Iraq 2003), a military operation launched during the 2003 invasion of Iraq
 Operation Desert Shield (Iraq), a 2006 operation by the Iraqi insurgency
 Operation Desert Shield, a defensive mission to prevent Iraq from invading Saudi Arabia
 Operation Desert Snowplough, a codename  for Danish operations under British command in Iraq
 Operation Desert Spider, an interrogation of Saddam Hussein
 Operation Desert Spring, an ongoing operation in Kuwait
 Operation Desert Storm, a codename of the Gulf War
 Operation Desert Strike, cruise missile strikes on Iraq
 Operation Desert Thrust, the name of the First Brigade 1st Infantry Division's operations in Iraq
 Operation Desert Thunder, a response to threats by Saddam Hussein to violate the no-fly zone

Video games
 Operation: Desert Storm (video game)
 Gulf War: Operation Desert Hammer, a video game